Ezzard Mack Charles (July 7, 1921 – May 28, 1975), known as the Cincinnati Cobra, was an American professional boxer and World Heavyweight Champion. Known for his slick defense and precision, he is often considered the greatest light heavyweight boxer of all time. Charles defeated numerous Hall of Fame fighters in three different weight classes. Charles retired with a record of 95 wins, 25 losses and 1 draw. He was posthumously inducted into the International Boxing Hall of Fame in the inaugural class of 1990.

Career
Charles was born in Lawrenceville, Georgia, and grew up in Cincinnati, Ohio. Charles graduated from Woodward High School in Cincinnati where he was already becoming a well-known fighter. Known as "The Cincinnati Cobra", Charles fought many notable opponents in both the light heavyweight and heavyweight divisions, eventually winning the World Championship in the latter. Although he never won the Light Heavyweight title, The Ring has rated him as the greatest light heavyweight of all time.

Career beginnings and military service

Charles started his career as a featherweight in the amateurs, where he had a record of 42–0. In 1938, he won the Diamond Belt Middleweight Championship. He followed this up in 1939 by winning the Chicago Golden Gloves tournament of champions. He won the national AAU Middleweight Championship in 1939. He turned professional in 1940, knocking out Melody Johnson in the fourth round. Charles won all of his first 17 fights before being defeated by veteran Ken Overlin. Victories over future Hall of Famers Teddy Yarosz and the much avoided Charley Burley had started to solidify Charles as a top contender in the middleweight division. However, he served in the U.S. military during World War II and was unable to fight professionally in 1945.

World heavyweight champion

Charles returned to boxing after the war as a light heavyweight, picking up many notable wins over leading light heavyweights, as well as heavyweight contenders Archie Moore, Jimmy Bivins, Lloyd Marshall and Elmer Ray. Shortly after his knock-out of Moore in their third and final meeting, tragedy struck. Charles fought a young contender named Sam Baroudi, knocking him out in Round 10. Baroudi died of the injuries he sustained in this bout. Charles was so devastated he almost gave up fighting. Charles was unable to secure a title shot at light heavyweight and moved up to heavyweight. After knocking out Joe Baksi and Johnny Haynes, Charles won the vacant National Boxing Association Heavyweight title when he outpointed Jersey Joe Walcott over 15 rounds on June 22, 1949. The following year, he outpointed his idol and former World Heavyweight Champion Joe Louis to become the recognized Lineal Champion. Successful defenses against Walcott, Lee Oma and Joey Maxim followed.

Charles vs. Marciano

In 1951, Charles fought Walcott a third time and lost the title by knockout in the seventh round. Charles lost a controversial decision in their fourth and final bout. If Charles had won this fight, he would have become the first man in history to regain the heavyweight championship. Remaining a top contender with wins over Rex Layne, Tommy Harrison and Coley Wallace, Charles knocked out Bob Satterfield in an eliminator bout for the right to challenge Heavyweight Champion Rocky Marciano. His two stirring battles with Marciano are regarded as ring classics. In the first bout, held in Yankee Stadium on June 17, 1954, he valiantly took Marciano the distance, going down on points in a vintage heavyweight bout. Charles is the only man ever to last the full 15-round distance against Marciano. Marciano won a unanimous decision.  Referee Ruby Goldstein scored the bout 8-5-2 in rounds for the champion.  Judge Artie Aidala scored the fight 9-5-1 while judge Harold Barnes' tally was 8-6-1.  Nevertheless, a number of fans and boxing writers felt that Charles deserved the decision. In their September rematch, Charles landed a severe blow that actually split Marciano's nose in half. Marciano's cornermen were unable to stop the bleeding and the referee almost halted the contest until Marciano rallied with an eighth-round knockout.

Later career

Like many boxers, financial problems forced Charles to continue fighting, losing 13 of his final 23 fights. He retired with a record of 93-25-1 (52 KOs).

Personal

Charles was very close with Rocky Marciano and a neighbor and friend of Muhammad Ali when they both lived on 85th Street in Chicago. Charles also starred in one motion picture: Mau Mau Drums, an independent (and unreleased) jungle-adventure film shot in and around Cincinnati in 1960 by filmmaker Earl Schwieterman.

Death

In 1968, Charles was diagnosed with amyotrophic lateral sclerosis, also known as Lou Gehrig's disease. The disease affected Charles' legs and eventually left him completely disabled. A fund raiser was held to assist Charles and many of his former opponents spoke on his behalf. Rocky Marciano in particular called Charles the bravest man he ever fought. The former boxer spent his last days in a nursing home. A chilling 1973 commercial showed Charles in his wheelchair horribly disabled by ALS. Charles died on May 28, 1975, in Chicago. He was buried at Burr Oak Cemetery in Alsip, Illinois.

Legacy

In 1976, Cincinnati honored Charles by changing the name of Lincoln Park Drive to Ezzard Charles Drive. This was the street of his residence during the height of his career.

In 2002, Charles was ranked No. 13 on The Ring magazine's list of the 80 Best Fighters of the Last 80 Years.

In 2006, Ezzard Charles was named the 11th greatest fighter of all time by the IBRO (International Boxing Research Organisation).

The "Cincinnati Cobra" was a master boxer of extraordinary skill and ability. He had speed, agility, fast hands and excellent footwork. Charles possessed a masterful jab and was a superb combination puncher. He was at his peak as a light-heavyweight. His record is quite impressive. Against top rate opposition like Archie Moore, Charley Burley, Lloyd Marshall, Jimmy Bivins, and Joey Maxim he was an impressive 16-2 combined. Despite being a natural light-heavy he won the heavyweight title and made 9 successful title defenses. Nearly 25% of voters had Charles in the top 10. Half of the voters had him in the top 15. Two thirds of voters had him inside the top 20.

Muhammad Ali said in his own autobiography:

"Ezzard Charles was a truly great fighter and champion. He was the only heavyweight champion, other than a young Sonny Liston, who I think would have really troubled me at my best."

In 2007, ESPN online ranks Ezzard Charles as the 27th greatest boxer of all time, ahead of such notable fighters as Mike Tyson, Larry Holmes and Jake LaMotta.

In 2009, Boxing magazine listed Ezzard Charles as the greatest Light Heavyweight fighter ever, ahead of the likes of Archie Moore, Bob Foster, Michael Spinks and Gene Tunney.

In 2022, a statue honoring Ezzard Charles was unveiled in Laurel Park Cincinnati, OH. 

Prominent boxing historian Bert Sugar listed Charles as the seventh greatest Heavyweight of all time.

Professional boxing record

See also

 List of heavyweight boxing champions

References

Further reading

External links

NBA World Heavyweight Title Fights - BoxRec
NYSAC World Heavyweight Title Fights - BoxRec
Ezzard Charles - CBZ Profile
Boxing Hall of Fame
Cincinnati History Library and Archives -- Ezzard Charles

|-

|-

|-

|-

|-

1921 births
1975 deaths
Boxers from Georgia (U.S. state)
Neurological disease deaths in Illinois
Deaths from motor neuron disease
Heavyweight boxers
International Boxing Hall of Fame inductees
Boxers from Chicago
Boxers from Cincinnati
World Boxing Association champions
Winners of the United States Championship for amateur boxers
World heavyweight boxing champions
People from Lawrenceville, Georgia
African-American boxers
American male boxers
Rocky Marciano
Sportspeople from the Atlanta metropolitan area
Woodward High School (Cincinnati, Ohio) alumni
Burials at Burr Oak Cemetery